Sébastien LeBlanc Canadian.(born 27 December 1973 in Montreal) is a former tour professional tennis player.  Leblanc captured three junior Grand Slam titles and played Davis Cup for Canada.  More of a doubles specialist, he won five Challenger events in doubles and reached a career-high doubles ranking of World No. 127.

Junior career
Leblanc teamed with fellow Québécois and Montrealer Sébastien Lareau to capture first the 1990 French Open junior doubles title and then a month later the 1990 Wimbledon junior doubles title.  In both finals they defeated the South African duo of Marcos Ondruska and Clinton Marsh in three sets, 6–7, 7–6, 9–7 at Roland Garros and 7–6(5) 4–6 6–3.  Then in August Leblanc teamed with another Montrealer, Greg Rusedski, to capture the U.S. Open junior doubles crown, defeating Marten Renström and Mikael Tillström in the final, 6–7 6–3 6–4.  Leblanc did not compete in the 1990 Australian Open missing out on a chance for completing the 'Grand Slam'.  In singles he lost in the first round at both Roland Garros and Flushing Meadows and reached the third round of Wimbledon, falling to eventual champion Leander Paes in three sets.

Senior career
Leblanc won the 1991 Montebello Challenger partnering Lareau and the 1995 Santiago Challenger playing with Brandon Coupe.  The resident of Saint-Bruno, Quebec won the Aptos Challenger three times in succession – from 1995 through 1997 – the first time playing with Brian MacPhie and the later two times partnering fellow Québécois and Montrealer Jocelyn Robichaud.  In ATP Tour and Grand Slam events, Leblanc posted a career win–loss of 8 and 22 with his best result being reaching the quarter-finals of the Canadian Open in 1991, partnering Lareau.  Leblanc also reached the second round of the 1992 Summer Olympics tournament, partnering Brian Gyetko.  He played in the main draw of one Grand Slam event at senior level, the 1997 Australian Open – he and partner Mark Keil lost in the first round.

In singles, Leblanc reached a career-high ranking of World No. 361, in August 1996.  His career Challenger event win–loss record stood at 3 wins, 9 losses, while at ATP Tour level it was 1 and 4.  His sole top flight match win was over World No. 18 Tim Henman in the opening round of the Canadian Open.

Davis Cup
Leblanc sole rubber appearance came surprisingly in singles, in a 1997 America Group I semi-final tie versus Venezuela, played in April.  He defeated José de Armas in a dead rubber, 2–6, 7–6(2), 6–0 in a tie Canada swept 5–0. The victory allowed gave Canada a place in qualifying for the World Group.  They lost the qualifying tie in September however to Slovakia 1–4, despite playing the tie at home (in Jarry Stadium).

Junior Grand Slam finals

Doubles: 3 (3 titles)

ATP Challenger and ITF Futures Finals

Doubles: 9 (5–4)

References

External links
 
 

1973 births
Living people
Canadian male tennis players
French Open junior champions
French Quebecers
Olympic tennis players of Canada
Tennis players from Montreal
US Open (tennis) junior champions
Wimbledon junior champions
Tennis players at the 1992 Summer Olympics
Grand Slam (tennis) champions in boys' doubles